A gun (pronunciation , English approximation:) or bang is a long Chinese staff weapon used in Chinese martial arts. It is known as one of the four major weapons, along with the qiang (spear), dao (sabre), and the jian (straight sword).  It is called, in this group, "The Grandfather of all Weapons". In Vietnam (as a result of Chinese influence), the gun is known as côn in Vietnamese martial arts.

Variants and styles 

The gun is fashioned with one thick end as the base and a thinner end near the tip, and is cut to be about the same height as the user or 6 foot. Besides the standard gun, there are also flail-like two section and three section varieties of the staff as well as non-tapered heavier variants. Numerous Chinese martial arts teach the staff as part of their curriculum, including (in English alphabetical order):

 Bagua seven star rod or Seven Star Stick (Qi Xing Gun), also called the Whip Stick (Bian Gun) or Heart High Stick (Xin Gun) - it is lighter and faster than the Ba Gua Staff, it can be used one-handed or two-handed.
 Bailangan, Northern staff
 Nangun, Southern staff
 Pigua Zhang's Feng Mo Gun - 'Frenzied Demon Staff' (劈掛拳 瘋魔棍).
 Shaolin Zhui Feng Gun - 'Wind Chaser Staff' (虎勇敢)
 Qún Yáng Gùn, Shepherd staff (This routine is performed with a straight heavy red oak staff)
 Six and a half point pole
 Staff of five tigers and goat herds
 Taiji staff (
 Taiji thirteen staff
Bailangan and nangun are frequently found in modern wushu competitions in gunshu and nangun events respectively. The IWUF has created three different standardized routines and an elementary routine for gunshu and two different routines for nangun.

In contemporary wushu 
Gunshu refers to the competitive event in modern wushu taolu where athletes utilize a gun in a routine. It was one of the four main weapon events implemented at the 1st World Wushu Championships due to its popularity. Modern staffs are often made from wax wood or rattan, both of which are strong woods, but flexible and light. Some versions may also feature metal or rubber parts, and the current modern staffs for competition are usually made of light carbon fiber. The newer staffs do not break like the wax wood ones and are even lighter.

The IWUF has also created three different standardized routines for competition as well as an elementary routine. The first compulsory routine was created and recorded by Yuan Wenqing in 1989.

Gunshu routines in international competition require certain staff techniques including: Píng Lūn Gùn (Horizontal Cudgel Windmill Wave), Pī Gùn (Cudgel Chop), Yún Gùn (Cudgel Cloud Waving), Bēng Gùn (Cudgel Tilt), Jiǎo Gùn (Cudgel Enveloping), Chuō Gùn (Cudgel Poke), Lì Wǔ Huā Gùn (Vertical Figure 8 with the Cudgel), Shuāng Shǒu Tí Liāo Huā Gùn (Two-handed Vertical Cudgel Uppercut). Only the Píng Lūn Gùn and Lì Wǔ Huā Gùn techniques have deduction content (codes 64 and 65 respectively).

In popular culture
 In Crouching Tiger, Hidden Dragon, Shu Lien uses a gun staff while  teaching Princess Jen.
 Kung Fu Hustle features Donut, the baker of Pigsty Alley, using gun staffs to fight the Axe Gang.
 In Avatar: The Last Airbender and The Legend of Korra, staff techniques used by airbenders are derived from fighting with the gun staff.
 Shang-Chi and the Legend of the Ten Rings features Shang-Chi, Ying Nan and many warriors of Ta Lao using gun staffs with dragon scales to fight the Ten Rings and the followers of the Dweller-in-Darkness.

See also 
Ruyi Jingu Bang, Sun Wukong's weapon
Ji, halberd
Bō and Jō, Japanese staves
Quarterstaff
Juego del Palo, Canarian (Spanish) staff
Canne de combat, French staff
Jogo do Pau, Portuguese staff

References

External links 
Some Basic Staff Tutorials
Shifu Alan Tinnion Representing Great Britain at the Open-World Invitational International Tournament of Chinese Games At Xian 1985 Gold Medal Performance  左 手 棍 Left Hand Staff 

Ancient weapons
Chinese melee weapons
Stick and staff weapons
Polearms
Events in wushu